Diplomatic relations between Croatia and the United States were established on April 7, 1992 following Croatia's independence from Yugoslavia. The mutual relations continue to be cordial, friendly, and very close.

Croatia has an embassy in Washington, D.C., general consulates in Chicago, Los Angeles, New York City, and consulates in Anchorage, Kansas City metropolitan area, Pittsburgh, Seattle and Houston. The US has an embassy in Zagreb.

American engagement in Croatia is aimed at fostering a democratic, secure, and market-oriented society that will be a strong US partner in Euro-Atlantic institutions. Bilateral relations between the two countries are described as very strong.

The Croatian diaspora in the US is one of the largest in the world with an estimate of more than 1.2 million members. Most of the Croats live in Chicago (~150,000), New York City, New Jersey and Connecticut (~80,000), St. Louis (~40,000), San Pedro (~35,000),  Detroit (~7,000) and San Jose (~5,000). The National Federation of Croatian Americans is the main organization that brings together Croats in the US.

Both countries are members of UN,  NATO, Euro-Atlantic Partnership Council, Organization for Security and Co-operation in Europe, International Monetary Fund, World Bank and World Trade Organization. In addition, Croatia  is an observer to the Organization of American States.

Embassy 

The official  American presence in Zagreb goes back at least to 1920, when the American Consulate in Zagreb, Kingdom of the Serbs, Croats, and Slovenes, was established. Zagreb was center of province Croatia-Slavonia. The Consulate remained open in the Kingdom of Yugoslavia until World War II began. At that time, the records indicate that American diplomatic personnel departed between May 1 and 14, 1941, in response to the German capture of Zagreb, and subsequent establishment of the Independent State of Croatia (NDH). NDH declared war to US in 1941 but US never formally recognized a new state. The Consulate in Zagreb was reopened after the war on May 9, 1946 and originally housed in small offices near the Botanical Garden. The consulate became a consulate general on August 1, 1958.

Upon the dissolution of Yugoslavia, the U.S. recognised Croatia as an independent state on April 7, 1992. The U.S. Consulate General in Zagreb gained the status of an embassy on August 25, 1992. The first U.S. ambassador to Croatia was Peter W. Galbraith who served on this position from 1993 to 1998.

The U.S. embassy in Croatia is located in Zagreb, southwest of Buzin. This 8000 m2 compound was opened on June 2, 2003. According to an article based on the WikiLeaks documents published in a British newspaper The Independent in 2013, the embassy, namely its fifth floor, is used as a regional base of CIA and NSA.

The U.S. embassy in Zagreb is a charter member of the League of Green Embassies and a founding member of the Zagreb Green Building Council. According to this, embassy support recycling, energy and water use reduction programs. The embassy also sponsors American Corners at libraries in Osijek, Rijeka, Zadar, and Zagreb.

Since November 2017, the U.S. ambassador to Croatia is William Robert Kohorst.

History

Background
The Republic of Ragusa, a merchant republic centered at the Croatian city of Dubrovnik, was one of the first foreign countries to de facto recognize independence of the United States. Ragusa extended that de facto recognition through the efforts of Francesco Favi, the Ragusan consul in Paris, on July 7, 1783. However, the Republic never recognized the United States in a de jure sense.

Visits of U.S. Presidents to Croatia 

The first U.S. President to visit Croatia was Richard Nixon, who came to Zagreb on 2 October 1970 during his state visit to Yugoslavia.  The choice to visit Zagreb during political and cultural developments in Socialist Republic of Croatia that would culminate in the Croatian Spring, along with Nixon's praise for the "spirit of Croatia" and his exclamation "Long live Croatia! Long live Yugoslavia!", has been interpreted as a statement of support for Croatian identity and greater autonomy within the federal framework of Yugoslavia.

The first U.S. president to visit independent Croatia was Bill Clinton on 13 January 1996. Clinton spent a few hours on the Zagreb Airport while returning from visiting IFOR troops in Tuzla, Bosnia and Herzegovina.  During the brief visit, Clinton gave a speech in front of a crowd waving Croatian and American flags, then met with Croatian President Franjo Tuđman.

On 4 April 2008, U.S. President George W. Bush arrived in Zagreb on an official 2-day state visit. The visit immediately followed the 2008 Bucharest summit of NATO countries where Croatia and Albania received invitations to join the alliance. Bush met with President of Croatia Stipe Mesić and Prime Minister Ivo Sanader, and gave a speech in St. Mark's Square in downtown Zagreb. Peaceful rallies were held during the visit to protest U.S. foreign policy and impending Croatian NATO membership.

Visit of Hillary Clinton to Croatia (2012)

US Secretary of State Hillary Clinton visited Croatia on October 30, 2012. During her visit she met with many Croatian officials including President Ivo Josipović, Prime Minister Zoran Milanović and Foreign Minister Vesna Pusić. Main topics of discussions were Croatian role in NATO and the Croatian accession to the European Union as well as economic relations between US and Croatia. Secretary Clinton called Croatia "a leader in Southeast Europe" that had well educated workforce, established infrastructure, great geopolitical location, adding that it was promising destination but that there was still a necessity for additional reforms, increase of transparency, elimination of bureaucratic barriers, as well as the privatization of the companies that are still owned by the state.

Visit of Joe Biden to Croatia (2015)

On November 25, 2015 US Vice President Joe Biden visited Croatia as a special guest of the Brdo-Brijuni Process Leaders' Summit that brings together heads of state from the countries of former Yugoslavia and Albania as well as special guests. The summit was co-chaired by Croatian President Kolinda Grabar-Kitarović and Slovenian President Borut Pahor. Discussed topics on the plenary session were integration of south-east Europe into Euro-Atlantic processes, migrant crisis, security challenges and the fight against terrorism, conflicts in the Middle East and Ukraine, as well as energy. Vice President Biden stated: "For the United States and for me personally, but I am speaking on behalf of the President Obama, this region has been of extreme interest for the last 25 years." In addition, Biden praised Brdo-Brijuni initiative as "a good job as it has managed to bring together heads of state for talks for the past five years". Vice President Biden also met with the Croatian Prime Minister Zoran Milanović and Foreign Minister Vesna Pusić with whom he talked about situation in the Middle East, especially about the war in Syria, migrant crisis and the security situation in the world after 2015 Paris terrorist attacks.

Visit of Mike Pompeo to Croatia (2020)

On October 2, 2020, U.S. secretary of state Mike Pompeo visited Dubrovnik, where he had a meeting with Croatia's prime minister Andrej Plenković and other Croatian government officials. Following the meeting, the Croatian foreign minister, Gordan Grlić-Radman, said that Croatia had signed no document whereby it would undertake to refrain from co-operating with China on the issues of security with a view to 5G. Pompeo's visit was foreshadowed by statements made by Croatia's president Zoran Milanović, who harshly criticised the U.S. top leaders, saying, among other things, that Donald Trump had ruined the international reputation of the United States. Following Pompeo's visit, Milanović, who had not participated in hosting the secretary of state, spoke against the Three Seas Initiative, saying it was the Obama administration′s initiative that was potentially harmful for Croatia as it was aimed at isolating Russia as well as Germany, an endeavour he said Croatia ought not to participate in.

Military cooperation

As of January 2020, the U.S. State Department′s web site that the U.S. Department of Defense had "a robust military-to-military relationship with Croatia" with the U.S. providing military assistance to Croatia in the form of training, equipment, equipment loans, and education in U.S. military schools.

In April 2014, Croatia took delivery of 30 U.S. MRAP vehicles out of the 212 MRAP vehicles that the U.S. government had decided on donating to Croatia.

On August 5, 2015 Croatia held a military parade, featuring thousands of soldiers, military vehicles and jets, to mark the 20th anniversary of Operation Storm, a key offensive in its independence struggle. USA sent a delegation composed of its top officials: Commander of the Minnesota National Guard, Gen. Richard C. Nash, deputy commander of US forces in Europe, Gen. Randz A. Kee, US Defense Attache Douglas M. Faherty and US Ambassador to Croatia Kenneth Merten.

The U.S. and Croatia work together in these 11 military programs, funds and initiatives:

Foreign Military Financing

Croatia received from this program from 2000 until FMF's suspension in 2003 $18.5 million. Once FMF was launched again in 2008 Croatia received  addition $14.5 million. Croatia spent this money mostly on purchase of communication systems, simulators and equipment for night surveillance.

Foreign Military Sales

Croatia bought $4.2 billion worth products from this program; flight equipment, communications devices, night vision equipment and software's for Croatia's Main Simulation Centre.

Global Peacekeeping Operations Initiative

Around $5.1 million that Croatia received from this program was spent for equipping two classrooms for foreign language learning in Knin and Našice, buying navigation equipment and equipment for  the night flying,  as well as for training helicopter pilots for the night flights.

Program - article 1206 - Train and Equip

From this program Croatia received $31 million from 2010 to 2014. With this money Croatia bought HMMWV vehicles for training, communication and navigation equipment, equipment for night surveillance, labeling and identification of army vehicles and MILES 2000 adjustment system for Croatian VHS-D rifle. In 2015, Croatia received $11 million for purchasing communications equipment and training its special forces.

Program - article 1202 - Enhanced ACSA (Acquisition and Cross Servicing Agreements)

Through this program US lends its allies that are participating in missions in Afghanistan and Iraq military equipment for a period of approximately one year. Croatia received through this program 50 HMMWV and 12 MRAP vehicles [which Croatia kept as a gift after the end of missions in Afghanistan and Iraq], ballistic missiles and systems for command, control and communication (Blue Force Tracking).

Excess Defense Articles

Through this program Croatia bought 212 used MRAP vehicles: 162 M-ATV, 30 Navistar MaxxPro Plus, and 20 medical vehicles MRAP HAGA.

Coalition Support Funds

Through this program Croatia received from the US partial refund of its money invested in ISAF missions in which Croatia participated from 2011 until 2013. $16.9 million were refunded to Croatia. This money will be used for improving maritime radar Enhanced Peregrine.

International Military Education and Training

Croatia at first participated in this program from 1995 to 2003 when it got banned from participating due to some diplomatic disagreements between US and Croatia. On October 2, 2006 George W. Bush with his decree abolished the restraining Croatia from participating in IMET program "because of the Croatian importance for US national interests".  Croatia through the IMET program implemented over 600 activities with costs estimated at about $9 million.

Cooperative Logistic Support Supply Arrangement

Croatia signed this agreement and became part of the US logistics data base. This agreement enables Croatia to independently buy spare parts for its HMMWV vehicles which wouldn't be possible without this agreement  because the only authorized buyer of spare parts for HMMWV is the US and anyone that wants to buy any spare parts has to ask US for permission.

Man-portable air-defense system

US donated to Croatia approximately $2 million through this program so Croatia could destroy some of its anti-aircraft systems that are dysfunctional.

The program of demining and the destruction of surplus munitions

US donated to Croatia approximately $2.5 million through this program for demining and destroying some Croatian surplus munitions.

Economic cooperation
Economic relations between Croatia and US are very good. In 2013 Croatia exported $327,992.000 worth goods to the US and imported from it $221,794.000 worth goods. US is the most important Croatian trade partner in North America in front of Cayman Islands and Canada, and eighth most important in the world.

In 2013, 220,043 Americans, who have made 548,727 overnight stays, came to Croatia on a holiday. The United States and Croatia have a bilateral investment treaty and investment protection agreement.

Despite Croatia having numerous direct services to the United States when it was part of Yugoslavia prior to the outbreak of the Yugoslav wars in the early 1990s, it wasn't until July 2019 that direct services resumed. American Airlines flies to Dubrovnik from Philadelphia seasonally.

In addition, the United States has given more than $27 million since 1998 in humanitarian assistance to Croatia. The US also has provided additional financial assistance to Croatia through the Southeastern European Economic Development Program (SEED) to facilitate democratization and restructuring of Croatia's financial sector, largely through programs managed by USAID.

See also 
 Croatia–Russia relations
 Croatian Americans
 United States–Yugoslavia relations
 United States–European Union relations
 European Union–NATO relations

References

External links
History of Croatia - U.S. relations